Gymnasura costaesignata is a moth of the family Erebidae. It was described by Max Gaede in 1925. It is found in Papua New Guinea.

References

 

Nudariina
Moths described in 1925
Moths of New Guinea